Eric Reiss (born 1954) is an American business and information architecture theorist, consultant and author, known for his work in the field of information architecture, usability, and service design. In 2010, he was named in a blog as "One of the Top 10 European Content Strategists to Watch". In 2019 he sued the Information Architecture Institute.

Biography

Early life and education 
Born in San Antonio, Texas in 1954, his family relocated to St. Louis prior to his first birthday when his father accepted a position at Washington University School of Medicine. Reiss is the son of two prominent physicians who played pivotal roles in bringing about the nuclear test-ban treaty of 1963 (see Linus Pauling "Activism"). His Viennese-born father, Eric Reiss, M.D., performed early and groundbreaking research on parathyroid hormone (PTH). His mother, Louise Zibold Reiss, M.D., as Director of the Baby Tooth Survey, was involved in mapping levels of radioactive Strontium-90 in the U.S. food chain secondary to nuclear fallout. His family moved to the Chicago suburb of Highland Park in 1964. He was active in theatre and the performing arts while at Highland Park High School from 1968–1972. During this time, Reiss started restoring player pianos and jukeboxes. He formed his first company, Reiss Player Piano Service, at age 16.

Reiss returned to St. Louis to study at Washington University in St. Louis in 1972. A ragtime pianist, Reiss was Musical Director on the Goldenrod Showboat on the Mississippi River levee during much of 1975, where he also participated in the National Ragtime Festival along with Trebor Tichenor, Dave Jason, Terry Waldo, and the Black Eagle Jazz Band. In 1976, he received his BA degree, having studied Performing Arts and Political Science.

Career in Scandinavian theater world 
After his graduation, Eric Reiss moved to Copenhagen, Denmark to become a stage director at the Royal Danish Theatre. He was originally apprenticed in the fall of 1976 to Danish director Sam Besekow, where he assisted with the production of Eduardo De Filippo's play Saturday, Sunday, Monday. In early 1977, Reiss was granted full director status by the theater. In 1977, his original play, Marionettes, was awarded first prize at the Illinois One-Act Play Festival.

Following a 10-year career in the Scandinavian theater world, publication of the first Danish-language adventure game (Skabet), and a short stint studying Egyptology, Reiss' first book, The Compleat Talking Machine led to a career change in 1986 when he migrated from theater to professional writing.

Career in business-to-business communications 
Reiss wrote the talking machine book, now in its fifth edition (10th printing). Reiss has since worked almost exclusively in developing business-to-business communications materials and marketing strategies.

With the advent of PC-based multimedia in the late 80s and the World Wide Web a few years later, Reiss combined his knowledge of theater, communication, and computers to build interactive business tools. In early 1997, he developed an on-line communications concept for his employer, Cross-Border Communications. The resulting microsite, Rick's Cafe, was an interactive precursor to a blog and was subsequently voted Macromedia Site of the Week.

Reiss is currently CEO of the Copenhagen-based FatDUX Group ApS, which designs online and offline interactive experiences. He is a past president of the Information Architecture Institute, served as Chair of the European Information Architecture Summit - EuroIA from 2005-2014, and is on the Advisory Board of the Copenhagen Business School (Department of Informatics) and the Romanian Institute of Information Architecture. Between 2009-2011, Reiss was an Associate Professor of Usability and Design at IE Business School (formerly Instituto de Empresa) in Madrid, Spain, where he received several awards for his teaching, including the "Best Professor" prize in 2009.

Personal life 
Reiss is still active as a performer and musician, working regularly with Vivienne McKee's London Toast Theatre in Copenhagen. He was also a regular on the MTV-produced candid-camera show, Rent Fup, during the season 1998–1999. Other acting credits include the Danish film, Miraklet i Valby (1989) and off-screen dubbing for Lars von Trier's Dancer in the Dark (2000).

Reiss and his wife Dorthe make their home in Copenhagen, Denmark. He holds citizenship from Denmark, Germany, and the United States.

Work 

Reiss is the author of Practical Information Architecture, Web Dogma '06. and Usable Usability. He has also contributed to several other books and publications, including Designing Web Navigation, Pervasive Information Architecture, Designing the Conversation, Speaker Camp and commentary to the online Encyclopedia of Human-Computer Interaction. 

Reiss was President of the Information Architecture Institute for two terms and was a founder of the European Information Architecture Summit and served as Chair from 2005-2014 at which time he stepped down. However, he was invited back to deliver the closing plenary at the next conference in Madrid and had two presentations in Stockholm a few years later. Reiss is active in the information architecture/usability/user experience/service design scene. On March 20, 2019 Reiss filed a petition for discovery against the Information Architecture Institute. Judge Patricia O‘Brian Sheahan dismissed the motion. On June 6, 2019 Reiss filed a general chancery claim in the Circuit Court of Cook County. The Information Architecture Institute as well as previous Information Architecture conference co-chairs, Colleen Chaflant, Nataniel Davis, Amy Jimenez Marquez, Stuart Maxwell, Bibiana Nunes, and Adam Polansky were issued summons to appear on July 1, 2019.

Selected publications 
 Reiss, Eric L. The compleat talking machine: a guide to the restoration of antique phonographs, 1986.
 Reiss, Eric L. Practical information architecture: a hands-on approach to structuring successful websites. Pearson Education, 2000.
 Reiss, Eric. Usable usability: simple steps for making stuff better. John Wiley & Sons, 2012.

Articles, a selection:
 Reiss, Eric. "IA column: It's not what you think, but how you think." Bulletin of the American Society for Information Science and Technology 34.3 (2008): 47-50.

References

External links

 Eric Reiss, Content Strategist, CEO FatDUX Copenhagen. CEO, the FatDUX Group at fatdux.com.

1954 births
Living people
Computer programmers
Information architects
Web developers
Washington University in St. Louis alumni
Copenhagen Business School
People from San Antonio